Gadirtha fusca is a moth of the family Nolidae. It is found in east-central and south-eastern China.

The length of the forewings is 18.5–22.4 mm for males and 20.9–23.1 mm for females. The ground colour of the forewings in males is brownish grey, with varying amounts of indistinct rufous areas. There is a rectangulate dark grey basal spot on the costa and a fainter dark grey triangulate spot proximal to the apex. The hindwings are dark grey. Females have pale brownish grey forewings. There are four to five generations per year in Hubei.

The larvae feed on the leaves of Triadica sebifera. There are six larval instars. The larvae reach a length of 28–33.5 mm and have a pale green to yellow-green ground colour and a yellow head. The species overwinters as an egg on the leaves and branches of the host plant. The eggs hatch in May.

Etymology
The species name refers to the dark greyish brown ground colour of the forewings.

Gallery

References

Moths described in 2014
Eligminae